Nemertoderma is a genus of worms belonging to the family Nemertodermatidae.

The species of this genus are found in Europe.

Species:
Nemertoderma bathycola 
Nemertoderma westbladi

References

Acoelomorphs